Victor Blackwell (born September 25, 1981) is an American television news anchor who currently co-hosts the weekend edition of CNN This Morning with Amara Walker on CNN.

Early life and education
Blackwell was class president of his high school graduating class at Milford Mill Academy in 1999.  He earned a B.A. in Broadcast Journalism from Howard University in Washington, D.C. While in college, he worked at Howard University’s public television station WHUT-TV.

Career

After college, Blackwell worked as a reporter and fill-in anchor at WHAG-TV in Hagerstown, Maryland.  He also worked as a reporter and weekend anchor at WTLV/WJXX in Jacksonville, Florida.  Blackwell was the first black main anchor at WPBF in West Palm Beach, Florida.  Blackwell joined CNN in 2012 as a correspondent, based at CNN’s southeast bureau.  In 2013, Blackwell’s exclusive reporting on the mysterious death of Georgia teenager Kendrick Johnson led to investigations by the Office of Secretary of State of Georgia and the US Attorney for Georgia’s Middle District.  In January 2014, Blackwell was promoted to co-host of New Day Saturday and Sunday with Christi Paul.

On April 19, 2021, he began co-hosting a two-hour afternoon block of CNN Newsroom with Alisyn Camerota.

Awards and honors
In 2009, Blackwell received a Regional Emmy Awards for Outstanding Feature Reporting.  He was also nominated for a Regional Emmy in 2007, 2008, and 2011.  Blackwell also received a Regional Edward R. Murrow Award for his reporting on the Stop Snitchin’ phenomenon and its impact on inner-city crime. Blackwell received the Unity Award from the Radio Television Digital News Association in 2007 for his reporting on the high school graduation rate of black boys.

Personal life
Blackwell came out as gay on CNN on December 21, 2013 in an on-air conversation with co-anchor Pamela Brown.

References

External links

CNN profile

1981 births
Living people
People from Atlanta
American male journalists
African-American journalists
Contestants on American game shows
American LGBT broadcasters
CNN people
21st-century African-American people
20th-century African-American people